Raymond Leslie Hanson (born ) is a former English cricketer who played first-class and List A cricket for Derbyshire in 1973.

Hanson was born in Chesterfield. He joined Derbyshire in 1971 and played for the Second XI. He made his only first-class appearance for Derbyshire in the 1973 season against Sussex in August. He was stand-in wicket-keeper for Bob Taylor but saw little of the ball during the match. In the same season, Hanson played one List A match in the Benson and Hedges Cup and one in the John Player League .

Hanson was a wicket-keeper and right-handed who played at the tailend.

External links

1951 births
Living people
Cricketers from Chesterfield, Derbyshire
English cricketers
Derbyshire cricketers